Katja Adler (born 20 May 1974) is a German politician from the Free Democratic Party.

Early life 
Adler was born in Eisenhüttenstadt, Brandenburg. Her parents are of German Jewish origin.

Political career 
At the 2021 German federal election, Adler unsuccessfully contested Hochtaunus, but was elected to the Bundestag on the state list. In parliament, she has since been serving on the Committee on Family Affairs, Senior Citizens, Women and Youth.

References 

1974 births
Living people
Members of the Bundestag for the Free Democratic Party (Germany)
Members of the Bundestag for Hesse
Members of the Bundestag 2021–2025
Female members of the Bundestag
21st-century German politicians
21st-century German women politicians
University of Hagen alumni